Dame Ann Patricia Dowling  (born 15 July 1952) is a British mechanical engineer who researches combustion, acoustics and vibration, focusing on efficient, low-emission combustion and reduced road vehicle and aircraft noise. Dowling is a Deputy Vice-Chancellor and Professor of Mechanical Engineering, and from 2009 to 2014 she was Head of the Department of Engineering at the University of Cambridge, where she was the first female professor in 1993. She was President of the Royal Academy of Engineering from 2014 to 2019, the Academy's first female president.

Education
Dowling was educated at Ursuline Convent School, Westgate, Kent, and the University of Cambridge (as a member of Girton College), where after studying mathematics at undergraduate level, and following a summer job at the Royal Aircraft Establishment, she was awarded a PhD degree in 1978. Dowling's doctorate was in aeroacoustics, specifically on the Concorde noise problem.

Career
Dowling's research career has been at University of Cambridge starting as a research fellow in 1977 but she has held visiting posts at the Massachusetts Institute of Technology (Jerome C Hunsaker Visiting Professor, 1999) and at the California Institute of Technology (Moore Distinguished Scholar 2001).
Dowling is one of four main panel chairs for the Research Excellence Framework.

On 3 February 2012, the oil company BP announced that Dowling was to become a non-executive director with immediate effect. She has been a non-executive board member at BIS since February 2014.

Awards and honours
Dowling was elected a Fellow of the Royal Academy of Engineering (FREng) in 1996 and a Fellow of the Royal Society in 2003. Her FRS nomination reads: .

Dowling was elected an international member of the National Academy of Engineering in 2008 for advances in acoustics and unsteady flow, and for leadership in collaborative research between industry and universities.

In February 2013 Dowling was listed as one of the 100 most powerful women in the United Kingdom by Woman's Hour on BBC Radio 4. and was the subject of an episode of The Life Scientific in 2012.

Dowling is a Patron of the Women's Engineering Society (WES).

In January 2014 Dowling was nominated for election as President of the Royal Academy of Engineering. She took up the position in September 2014, and in that role chaired a 2015 review (the 'Dowling Review') of business–university research collaboration, published in July 2015.

She was appointed a CBE in 2002 and promoted to DBE in 2007. In 2016 she was appointed to the Order of Merit.

The James Watt International Gold Medal was awarded to her in 2016 by the Institution of Mechanical Engineers for her work associated with efficient, low emission combustion; and understanding, modelling and reducing the noise from cars, helicopters and fixed-wing aircraft
.

In November 2017, Dowling was elected to the Chinese Academy of Engineering alongside 18 foreign individuals including Bill Gates and L. Rafael Reif.

In 2019 she received the Royal Medal.

References

External links
,  Sidney Sussex College news
Ann Dowling's University of Cambridge Department of Engineering bio
Creating silent skies – Professor Dame Ann Dowling CBE FREng Ingenia, Issue 37, Dec 2008
www.theukrc.com Women of Outstanding Achievement:Professor Dame Ann Dowling

1952 births
Living people
British women engineers
British mechanical engineers
British people of Irish descent
Dames Commander of the Order of the British Empire
Members of the Order of Merit
Fellows of the Royal Academy of Engineering
Female Fellows of the Royal Academy of Engineering
Presidents of the Royal Academy of Engineering
Fellows of Sidney Sussex College, Cambridge
Fellows of the Royal Society
Female Fellows of the Royal Society
Directors of BP
British corporate directors
Alumni of Girton College, Cambridge
Members of the University of Cambridge Department of Engineering
21st-century women engineers
Foreign members of the Chinese Academy of Engineering
People from Thanet (district)
Engineering professors at the University of Cambridge